Opera in the United States dates to the 18th century.

Colonial era
The first opera known to have been performed in the American colonies was the ballad opera Flora, which was performed in Charleston, South Carolina in 1735.

Opera in New Orleans began prior to the Louisiana Purchase, with the first recorded opera being a performance of André Grétry's Sylvain in May 1796.

See also
Opera in Latin America
American Indian opera
List of North American opera companies

Further reading

Opera, entry in "The United States Encyclopedia of History", Volume 13

References